Southern Shores Field Service Council is a field service council of the Michigan Crossroads Council.

History

2012 Merger
The Scouting program in the Lower Peninsula of Michigan saw drastic drop in membership beginning in the early 2000s. The decrease in population was due to the economy in Michigan and the resulting out-migration of population, jobs and industry. The Area 2 Project was created in 2010 and studied the impact on Scouting and presented the Crossroads Recommendation, which proposed that the ten councils in Michigan merge into one large council. As a result, in 2012, four field service councils were created consisting of former councils.

The Southern Shores Field Service Council is the result of a merger between the Great Sauk Trail Council and Southwest Michigan Council.

2020 Merger
In 2020, Michigan Crossroads Council made a decision to merge their Field Service Councils to create one central Council.

Organization

The council is administratively divided into districts:
 Lenape District serving Lenawee County and Hillsdale County
 Three Fires District serving Livingston County
 Running Waters District serving Monroe County and the city of Flat Rock
 Huron Trails District serving Washtenaw County
 Wabano District serving Van Buren County and Berrien County
 Pathfinder District serving Kalamazoo County and St. Joseph County
 Nottawa Trails District serving Western Calhoun County and Branch County
 Cascades District serving Jackson County

Properties

Operating as of 2020

Camp Teetonkah
Located on Wolf Lake in Jackson, MI; Camp Teetonkah claims to be the second oldest scout camp in the United States.  It boasts 240 aches of land and currently caters to Cub Scout programs.

Closed as of 2020

Camp Rota-Kiwan
Formerly located in Texas Township south of Kalamazoo, MI; Camp Rota-Kiwan formerly occupied nearly 200 acres of land and was closed by the council in 2019 for financial reasons.

Camp Munhacke
Formerly located on Bruin Lake in Gregory, MI, Camp Munhacke was closed by the council on December 31, 2019, for financial reasons.

Camp Kanesatake
Formerly located on Washington Lake in Cambridge, MI, Camp Kanesatake was purchased in 1926 and operated for roughly 50 years.

Wrights Lake Scout Camp
Formerly located in Evart, MI, Wright's Lake Scout Camp was closed by the council after the 1995 season for financial reasons.

Order of the Arrow

Kishahtek Lodge (2012-2020)
Kishahtek Lodge, maintained the lodge number 88, and served as the Field Service Council's Order of the Arrow Lodge. The name is translated as "Northern Lights" in Lenne Lenape, and the totem is the wolverine.

The lodge was formed from merging Manitous Lodge 88 and Nacha-Mawat Lodge 373 after the Great Sauk Trail Council and Southwest Michigan Council merged into the Southern Shores Field Service Council.

Similar to the Field Service Council, the lodge is divided into chapters, which correspond within district boundaries
 Allohak Chapter in the Huron Trails District. This name comes from a prior lodge which served the Ann Arbor area.
 Carcajou Chapter in the Wabano District.  Named after the Carcajou Lodge 373 that served the Southwestern Michigan Council prior to merging with the Fruit Belt Area and Nottawa Trails Councils in 1973.  Carcajou Lodge had the Camp Madron Dance Team.
 Lenape Chapter in the Lenape District
 Mandoka Chapter in the Nottawa Trails District. Named after the Mandoka Lodge 315 that served the Nottawa Trails Council prior to merging with the Southwestern Michigan and Fruit Belt Area Councils in 1973.
 Munhacke Chapter in the Three Fires District. This name comes from a prior lodge which served Livingston County
 Tecumseh Chapter in the Running Waters District. This name comes from a prior lodge which served Monroe County
 Teetonkah Chapter in the Cascades District. This name comes from a prior lodge which served Jackson County
 Wakazoo Chapter in the Pathfinder District. Named after the Wakazoo Lodge 203 that served the Fruit Belt Area Council prior to merging with the Southwestern Michigan and Nottawa Trails Councils in 1973.

Manitous Lodge (1995-2012)
The Manitous Lodge was formed as a result of the merger of the Land'o'Lakes Council and the Wolverine Council, the merger forced the Allohak and Teetonkah lodges to restructure into the new lodge.  The Manitous lodge totem was the medicine wheel. Manitous Lodge was the home lodge of the 1995 National Chief Josh Feigelson

Allohak Lodge (1973-1995)
The Allohak lodge was formed when the Wolverine council absorbed the Portage Trails council.  The Allohak lodge totem was the Wolverine.

Munhacke Lodge (1936-1973)

Tecumseh Lodge (1946-1973)
The Tecumseh lodge served the Wolverine council from 1946 until its merger in 1973.  The lodge totem was a 4-leaf clover due to the lodge's location in the area locally known as the Irish Hills.

Teetonkah Lodge (1941-1995)

Nacha-Mawat Lodge (1973-2012)

Wakazoo (1941-1973)

Mandoka (1945-1973)

Carcajou (1948-1973)

See also
 Scouting in Michigan

References

Local councils of the Boy Scouts of America
Central Region (Boy Scouts of America)
Youth organizations based in Michigan
2012 establishments in Michigan